Maurenbrecher is a German surname. Notable people of the surname include the following:
 Max Maurenbrecher (1874–1929), German publicist, pastor and politician
 Wilhelm Maurenbrecher (1838–1892), German historian

German-language surnames
Surnames of German origin